The Worst of Deja Voodoo is a collection of singles, outtakes and oddities by the Canadian garage rock band Deja Voodoo.

Track listing
Monsters in My Garage
More Songs About Monsters and Food
Feed That Thing
Surfing on Mars
Bullfrog
Duh Papa Duh
Driving on Drugs
Rock Therapy
Night Time
Surfer Joe
Phantom Skateboarder
I Wanna Come Back from the World of LSD
Vegetables
Vang Gogh's Ear
Baby Honey
If You're So Smart
Boppin' 88
Peace, Love and Flowers
Sigmund Freud
Oh Yeah
Wall of Paisley
Lizard!
Into the Gumbo
Raised By Wolves

Personnel
 Tony Dewald, drums
 Gerard van Herk, guitar/voice

Influences and Inspirations
Deja Voodoo are known for their extensive liner notes, showing their encyclopedic knowledge of music from the Fifties, the Sixties and the Seventies:

"Here are some of the folks the Vodoo cats have gotten larcenous with this time: Jan and Dean, Tornados, Shangri-Las, Mickey & Sylvia, Diamonds, Hasil Adkins, Gun Club, Big Joe Turner, Screamin' Jay Hawkins, Elvis Presley, Monkees, Beach Boys, Surfaris, Hank Mizell, Bobby "Boris" Pickett, Undertones, Little Richard, Coasters, Rock-a-Teens, Johnny Burnette's Rock and Roll Trio, Cramps, The Fee-Fi-Four Plus Two, Butthole Surfers, Marcels, Strangeloves, Sonics, Barett Strongs, Everly Brothers, Muppets, and Jackie Brenston." (Quoted from the album's sleeve)

References

External links

1987 compilation albums
Deja Voodoo (Canadian band) albums
Og Music albums